Sharnbasva University is a private university in Kalaburagi, Karnataka. It is the first private university to be established in the Kalyana-Karnataka region.

History 
It was established in 2017.

Campus 
The university campus is located on 60 acres of land on the outskirts of Gulbarga.

References

External links
 

Private universities in India
Educational institutions established in 2017
2017 establishments in Karnataka